In chemistry, the heteropolymetalates are a subset of the polyoxometalates, which consist of three or more transition metal oxyanions linked together by shared oxygen atoms to form a closed 3-dimensional molecular framework. In contrast to isopolymetalates, which contain only one kind of metal atom, the heteropolymetalates contain differing main group oxyanions. The metal atoms are usually group 6 (Mo, W) or less commonly group 5 (V, Nb, Ta) transition metals in their highest oxidation states. They are usually colorless to orange, diamagnetic anions. For most heteropolymetalates the W, Mo, or V, is complemented by main group oxyanions phosphate and silicate. Many exceptions to these general statements exist, and the class of compounds includes hundreds of examples.

Structure
Certain structural motifs recur. The Keggin ion for example is common to both molybdates and tungstates with diverse central heteroatoms. The Keggin and Dawson structures have tetrahedrally-coordinated heteroatoms, such as P or Si, and the Anderson structure has an octahedral central atom, such as aluminium.

Heteropolyacids
Generally, the heteropolymetalates are more thermally robust than homopolymetalates. This trend reflects the stabilizing influence of the tetrahedral oxyanion that "glues" together the transition metal oxo framework. One reflection of their ruggedness, heteropolymetalates can be isolated in their acid form, whereas homopolymetalates typically cannot. Examples include:
Silicotungstic acid, 
Phosphomolybdic acid, 
Phosphotungstic acid,

Isomerism
The Keggin structure has 5 isomers, which are obtained by (conceptually) rotating one or more of the four  units through 60°.

Lacunary structures
The structure of some POMs are derived from a larger POM's structure by removing one or more addenda atoms and their attendant oxide ions, giving a defect structure called a lacunary structure. In 2014, vanadate species with similar, selective metal-binding properties were reported.

Uses

This type of acid is a common re-usable acid catalyst in chemical reactions.

The heteropolyacids are widely used as homogeneous and heterogeneous catalysts, particularly those based on the Keggin structure as they can possess qualities such as good thermal stability, high acidity and high oxidising ability. Some examples of catalysis are:
Homogeneous acid catalysis
Prins reaction by 
polymerisation of THF by 
Heterogeneous acid catalysis
dehydration of propan-2-ol to propene and methanol to hydrocarbons by 
Homogeneous oxidation
cyclohexene +  to adipic acid by the mixed addenda 

Heteropolyacids have long been used in analysis and histology and are a component of many reagents e.g. the Folin-Ciocalteu reagent, folins phenol reagent used in the Lowry protein assay and EPTA, ethanolic phosphotungstic acid.

See also
Phosphomolybdic acid
Phosphotungstic acid
Silicotungstic acid

Citations

References
 

 
Acid catalysts